Miss Divine Beauty is a national beauty pageant in India operating under the parent organization Divine Group, that primarily selects India's representatives to compete at Miss Earth, an annual international beauty pageant working towards environmental protection and promoting awareness. Miss Earth is one of the Big Four major international beauty pageants in the world.

The reigning Miss Divine Beauty (Miss Earth India) is Rashmi Madhuri, who was crowned the title of Miss India Earth 2021 by the former queen Tanvi Kharote. Tanvi Kharote was crowned in 2020 by the Miss earth India 2019 titleholder Tejaswini Manogna. Also, Miss Divine Beauty has introduced a new Award "Beauty With A Responsibility" in 2021. This award aims to not only acknowledge the work done by the beauty queens in order to bring a substantial change but also support the future endeavours of their projects. Present winner of the award is Vanshika Parmar. As an eco enthusiast from New Delhi, she initiated Project Go Green to become a role model for the clean and green Earth movement.

History
India has participated in the Miss Earth pageant since its inception in 2001. From 2001 to 2013, India's representatives at Miss Earth were selected by Femina Miss India, which is sponsored by Femina, a women's magazine published by the Times Group. Subsequently, the franchise for selecting representatives from India to participate at the Miss Earth pageant was acquired by Glamanand Supermodel India. The Glamanand Group lost the franchise privilege in 2018.

The Divine Group acquired the rights to send India's delegates to the Miss Earth in the year 2019. Deepak Agarwal, the founder and CEO of Divine Group, serves as one of the National Directors. The first edition of Miss Divine Beauty was held on 31 August 2019 at Kingdom of Dreams, New Delhi. The finale was witnessed by Miss Earth 2018 Nguyễn Phương Khánh, Miss Intercontinental 2018 Karen Gallman and Miss Earth Water 2018 Valeria Ayos. Tejaswini Manogna became the first delegate to win the title of Divine Miss India. From 2019 onwards, Miss Divine Beauty is now responsible for the selection of future Miss Earth India.

Miss Divine Beauty Winners

Editions

Representatives at international pageants 
Color key

Miss Earth

Miss Global

Miss Intercontinental

See also
Miss Earth India
List of beauty pageants in India

References

External links

 Official website of Miss Divine Beauty

Beauty pageants in India
2019 establishments in India
Indian awards